The men's doubles of the 2022 I.ČLTK Prague Open tournament took place on clay in Prague, Czech Republic.

Marc Polmans and Sergiy Stakhovsky were the winners of the last edition but did not defend their title. Polmans chose not to participate, while Stakhovsky retired at the beginning of 2022.

Nuno Borges and Francisco Cabral won the title after defeating Andrew Paulson and Adam Pavlásek 6–4, 6–7(3–7), [10–5] in the final.

Seeds

Draw

References

External links
 Main draw

I.ČLTK Prague Open - Men's doubles
I.ČLTK Prague Open